Polytrimethylene terephthalate (PTT), is a polyester synthesized and patented in 1941. It is produced by a method called condensation polymerization or transesterification.  The two monomer units used in producing this polymer are: 1,3-propanediol and terephthalic acid or dimethyl terephthalate. Similar to polyethylene terephthalate, the PTT is used to make carpet fibers.

PTT's value as a commercial polymer has improved due to more economical and efficient methods to produce 1,3-propanediol in the 1980s by Degussa, via acrolein, and Shell via the hydroformylation of ethylene oxide. DuPont has successfully commercialized the production of this polymer via 1,3-propanediol obtained by fermentation. These developments may allow PTT to effectively compete against PBT and PET, two polyesters that have been far more successful than PTT to date.

Production
Similar to the ubiquitous poly(ethylene terephthalate), this polymer is prepared by the esterification of 1,3-propanediol (HO(CH2)3OH) with terephthalic acid (C6H4(COOH)2), or by transesterification of dimethyl terephthalate:

This polymer has been commercialized as Sorona by DuPont.

Applications
On Friday, March 20, 2009, the Federal Trade Commission approved a subclass to polyester called triexta. The PTT fiber used in Mohawk's SmartStrand carpet, and branded Sorona by Dupont can be labeled triexta. Triexta has been reported to have several advantages over polyethylene terephthalate, including better stain resistance and softness.

The FTC had last approved an extension for residential carpet in 1959. Mohawk Industries and DuPont applied jointly for FTC approval of the triexta polyester subclass in 2006; it was approved three years later.

References

External links
 Forensic Science Communications literature review of Polytrimethylene terephthalate

Polyesters
Plastics
Terephthalate esters